In Mandaeism, halalta is sacramental rinsing water used in rituals such as the masiqta (death mass).

During the Ṭabahata Masiqta, halalta is kept in bottles. Priests use the water to rinse their bowls and then drink all of it, since none of it can be spilled or wasted.

See also
Mambuha
Holy water

References

Mandaean ceremonial food and drink
Water and religion
Mandaic words and phrases